Father Sebastiaan is an American fangsmith, published author and impresario. He is a former dental assistant working as a "fangsmith," crafting custom made fangs for consumers. He is the founder of the Sabretooth Clan, a fangmaking business and social network for the vampire subculture, and has worked as an author and co-author of several books on the occult and the vampire subculture.

Biography

Van Houten was born in San Diego, California to a military family and spent much of his early years traveling. He was later attended a Quaker boarding school and at age fourteen, discovered the goth subculture through Anne Rice novels and later the Vampire: The Masquerade during his teenage years. Van Houten also apprenticed as a dental assistant and became active during the 1990s New York City Vampyre club scene. He is an Impresario club promoter, creating The New York Vampire Ball in 1996 and The Endless Night Festival in New Orleans in 1998, one of the "largest vampire gatherings in the world". He is noted with writing the first "Black Veils" based on the code of conduct of a club night he managed entitled "Long Black Veil."

Media 
Father Sebastiaan is best known for appearances on Travel Channel's Ghost Adventures. He also is a host of the largest Vampire Subculture event the Endless Night Vampire Balls.

Bibliography

Books

 The Vampyre Almanac 2000 (TheSanguinarium.com Press, 2000)
 Vampyre Sanguinomicon: The Lexicon of the Living Vampire (Weiser, 2010)
 Vampyre Virtues: The Red Veils (TheSanguinarium.com Press, 2011)
 Vampyre Magick: The Grimoire of the Living Vampire (Weiser, 2012)
 The Vampyre Almanac 2012 (TheSanguinarium.com Press, 2012)
 Vampyre Virtues; The Purple Veils (TheSanguinarium.com Press 2013)
 Mysteries of Paris; Darkside of the City of Lights (Bast Books 2014)
 Black Veils; The Vampire Lexicon (Bast Books 2018)
 Black Veils; Master Vampyre Edition (Bast Books 2020)
 Black Veils; Vampyre Tarot (Bast Books 2020)
 In the Words of the Father, Memoirs of the Vampyre Sebastiaan Part 1 the 1990s (Bast Books 2021)

Co-authored books

 The Vampyre Almanac (Sanguinarium Press, 2000) with Katherine Ramsland and Michelle Belanger.
 V: The Book of the Strigoi VII (Aangel Publishing, 2003) with Layil Umbralux, Madame X.

Filmography
 The Secret Life of Vampires (A&E, 2005)
 Vampire Secrets (History Channel, 2006)
 Vampyres (Avalanche Productions, 2007) documentary based on the book Vampyres: When Reality Goes Beyond Fiction by Laurent Courau
 Ghost Adventures (Travel Channel, 2017)

References

Further reading
 Belanger, Michelle A. The Psychic Vampire Codex: A Manual of Magick and Energy Work. 30 November 2004. Red Wheel/Weiser.

External links
 
 
 Elements Of Vampyre Magick article on Disinfo

Living people
1975 births
Vampirism
Goth subculture
American male writers